General Periera may refer to:

Cecil Pereira (1869–1942), British Army major general
George Pereira (1865–1923), British Army brigadier general
Nuno Álvares Pereira (1360–1431), Portuguese general

See also
General Perera (disambiguation)